The 1936–37 season was the 60th Scottish football season in which Dumbarton competed at national level, entering the Scottish Football League and the Scottish Cup.  In addition Dumbarton competed in the Dumbartonshire Cup.

Scottish League

After the previous season's disastrous performance, Dumbarton began their 15th successive season in the Second Division with a complete clear out of playing staff.  Amongst other initiatives, Dumbarton entered into an arrangement with Clyde whereby their 'second string' players would be made available for development.  Initially there was a big improvement, with 6 wins and 2 draws being gained from the first 10 league games, but with the next 11 games yielding just a single point, the earlier confidence disappeared and eventually Dumbarton finished 15th out of 18, with 27 points - half of the points won by champions Ayr United.

Scottish Cup

In the Scottish Cup, there was more disappointment.  The first round tie against Highland League opponents, Keith was won, but only just.  However Dumbarton were not to be so lucky in the second round and were dumped out of the competition by non-league minnows Duns.

Dumbartonshire Cup
The only bright spot of another poor season was when Dumbarton retained the Dumbartonshire Cup with victory over amateur side Vale Ocaba.

Player statistics

|}

Source:

Transfers

Players in

Players out 

In addition Ronald Cameron, A Clark, William Clark, Robert Hogg, Robert Kerr, Archibald Taylor and Archibald Turner all played their last games in Dumbarton 'colours'.

Source:

References

Dumbarton F.C. seasons
Scottish football clubs 1936–37 season